Valérie Oppelt (born 10 December 1973) is a French politician of La République En Marche! (LREM) who was elected to the French National Assembly on 18 June 2017, representing the department of Loire-Atlantique.

In parliament, Oppelt served on the Economic Affairs Committee from 2017 until 2019, where she was her parliamentary group's coordinator. From 2019 until 2020, she was a member of the Committee on Legal Affairs. She later joined the Committee on Social Affairs in 2020.

Early in the term, Oppelt and Olivia Grégoire launched an informal group of around 50 LREM members in support of strengthening entrepreneurship. In July 2019, she decided not to align with her parliamentary group's majority and became one of 52 LREM members who abstained from a vote on the French ratification of the European Union's Comprehensive Economic and Trade Agreement (CETA) with Canada.

She lost her seat in the second round of the 2022 French legislative election to Andy Kerbrat from La France Insoumise.

References

1973 births
Living people
Women members of the National Assembly (France)
La République En Marche! politicians
21st-century French women politicians
Deputies of the 15th National Assembly of the French Fifth Republic
Politicians from Nantes
French people of German descent
Members of Parliament for Loire-Atlantique